Max Gazzè (born 6 July 1967 in Rome, Italy) is an Italian singer-songwriter and musician. He is known for his high-pitched voice. He is also a member of the trio Fabi Silvestri Gazzè with Niccolò Fabi and Daniele Silvestri.

Biography 

Max Gazzè was born in Rome, his father was from the Province of Ragusa. He emigrated to Belgium in 1982 where he spent his childhood, his father being a diplomat at the embassy of Italy, and he studied at the European School. At the age of 6 he started learning piano, and at 14 dedicated himself to bass guitar and began to perform with groups in clubs in Brussels. From 1985–1990 he played with a number of Jazz fusion, funk, and rock bands around Europe.

Personal life
He has four children: Samuele (b. 1998), Bianca (b. 2001) and Emily (b. 2006) from his former wife and Silvia (b. 2013) from a following relationship.  The lyrics of his songs are written in collaboration with his brother Francesco Gazzè.

Discography

Solo studio albums
Contro un'onda del mare (1996)
La favola di Adamo ed Eva (1998)
Max Gazzè (2000)
Ognuno fa quello che gli pare? (2001)
Un giorno (2004)
Tra l'aratro e la radio (2008)
Quindi? (2010)
Sotto casa (2013)
Maximilian (2015)
Alchemaya (2018)
La Matematica Dei Rami (2021)

Collaborative studio albums
Il Padrone Della Festa (2014) with Niccolò Fabi and Daniele Silvestri

Duets 
 With Ginevra Di Marco: La tua realtà
 With Carmen Consoli: Il motore degli eventi
 With Daniele Silvestri: Pallida
 With Mao: Colloquium vitae
 With Niccolò Fabi: Vento d'estate
 With Paola Turci: Il debole fra i due
 With Alex Britti: ...Solo con te
 With Stephan Eicher: Cenerentola a mezzanotte
 With Paola Turci e Marina Rei: Il solito sesso (during the duets evening of the 58º Festival di Sanremo, 2008)
 With i Bluvertigo e Morgan: Segnali di vita
 With i Jetlag and Raf: È necessario
 With Luca Barbarossa and Roy Paci: Non mi stanco mai
 With Serena Abrami: Scende la pioggia
 With Carl Brave: Posso, Cristo di Rio

Collaborations
 1996 – Rappresaglia, Intro, Seguimi, Hold me, Cohiba, Un giorno lontano, Me fece mele a chepa, Via col vento, Samantha, Il dado, Strade di Francia, Lasciami andare, Pino – fratello di Paolo in Il dado by Daniele Silvestri
 1998 – Vento d'estate in Niccolò Fabi by Niccolò Fabi
 1998 – O Caroline in The different you – Robert Wyatt e noi
 1999 – Aria, Pozzo dei desideri, Tu non-torni mai, Giro in si, Desaparecido, Sto benissimo in Signor Dapatas by Daniele Silvestri
 1999 – Neretva, Tempo di attesa and Le grandi scoperte in Trama tenue by Ginevra Di Marco
 2000 – Di giada e di veleno in Marjorie Biondo by Marjorie Biondo
 2000 – Testardo in Occhi da orientale by Daniele Silvestri
 2001 – Saluto l'inverno in Mi basta il paradiso by Paola Turci
 2001 – Troppo sensibile in Iperbole by Raf
 2002 – Silvia, La festa and Cellule in Non è successo niente by Alberto Belgesto
 2002 – Sette sono i re and Pinto Stefano in Bondo! Bondo! by Bandabardò
 2003 – Taxi Europa in Taxi Europa by Stephan Eicher
 2007 – Foolin' Around in Private Paradise by Jacques Villeneuve
 2007 – 92100 in Io sto qui by Tinturia
 2007 – Faccia di velluto, Il suo nome, Ninetta Nanna, Che bella faccia in Il latitante by Daniele Silvestri

Filmography

Appearances
 1999: Una musica può fare (Nuove Proposte – 8th)
 2000: Il timido ubriaco (4th)
 2008: Il solito sesso (12th)
 2013: Sotto casa(Selected) and I tuoi maledetissimi impegni (7th)

References

External links

1967 births
Italian male singers
People of Sicilian descent
Living people
Singers from Rome
Alumni of the European Schools